Robinson Ekspeditionen 2009 was the twelfth season of the Danish version of the Swedish show Expedition Robinson. This season premiered on September 31, 2009, and aired until November 23, 2009.

Overview
The main twist this season was that the contestants were to be divided up into tribes based on the results of an IQ test they took before the show. The season began with four players exiting in episode 1, only one of which was eliminated. The first of these four was Jesper Hansen, who was evacuated due to medical reasons before the tribes were formed. Then siblings Michael Kristiansen and Sascha Kristiansen both refused to compete in the first immunity challenge and decided to leave the show shortly after it concluded.

Beginning with the elimination of Andrew Prasana in episode 3 to the merge, all contestants voted out of the game were sent to "Utopia", where following the merge, they would compete to return to the game. In another twist, a joker, Maureen Cruz, entered the game in episode 5 to replace the mole Gerard "Anders" Hansen, who had been ejected from the game in episode 4 as the end of the first part of the mole twist. Another twist that took place in episode 5 was that the tribes were shuffled and given new names (Mensirip and Tenga). Another twist that took place in episode 5 was that of the replacement mole. The producers asked each contestant if they wanted to be the new mole and out of those who said yes the producers chose to make Ditte Jensen the new mole. As part of this new twist, only Ditte was allowed to vote at the next tribal council.

Prior to the merge in episode 7, the remaining twelve contestants took part in a challenge to determine who would make the merge. Ultimately, Kim Duelund and Mira Thomsen lost the challenge and were eliminated. In episode 8, Ditte, like the first mole Anders, was ejected from the game. In episode 9, instead of a tribal council, five of the contestants took place in an elimination challenge. Jan Andersem lost the challenge and was eliminated from the game. In episode 10, Rasmus had to be evacuated from the game after collapsing from exhaustion. Shortly after Jan's evacuation, the remaining contestants took part in an elimination challenge. Sandra Adelheid lost the challenge and was eliminated from the game. In episode 11, the contestants competed in another elimination challenge. Villy Eenberg lost the challenge and was sent to utopia. Eileen Pehrsson, who was voted out in the same episode, also was sent to utopia.

In the final episode of the season, the remaining contestants in utopia took part in a final duel which Villy won. The final five then competed in a series of challenges which ultimately led to the elimination of Andrew and Søren Petersen. Ultimately, it was Villy Eenberg, who had been eliminated twice throughout the competition, who won the season over Maureen Cruz and Nicolai Karlson by winning the final challenge.

Finishing order

References

External links
http://new.tv3.dk/robinson/
http://www.worldofbigbrother.com

Robinson Ekspeditionen seasons
2009 Danish television seasons
Danish reality television series